G.W Graham Secondary School, previously G.W Graham Middle-Secondary School, is a high school for students from  to  in Chilliwack, British Columbia. It is part of School District 33 Chilliwack.

In 2018, the school district proposed a reorganization. An expansion plan for the school was announced in 2020.

References

High schools in British Columbia
International Baccalaureate schools in British Columbia
Education in Chilliwack
Educational institutions in Canada with year of establishment missing